Cecilia "Cheche" Aldaba Lim-Lázaro (born September 8, 1945, in Los Angeles, California), is an acclaimed Filipino broadcast journalist and the founding President of Probe Productions Inc. as well as an Editor-at-Large of online news website Rappler.

Profile
The eldest of six children, Cecilia "Cheche" Aldaba Lim, was born to Luis Lim, an engineer, and Estefania Aldaba-Lim, a psychologist and former secretary of Department of Social Welfare and Development. She was born September 8, 1945, in the US but decided to give up her US citizenship and chose to be legally Filipina when she applied for a scholarship for a master's degree in radio and television from the University of Michigan.

In 1966, she obtained her Bachelor of Arts degree in speech and drama at the University of the Philippines Diliman. She continued her studies at the University of Michigan and obtained her master's degree in radio-television in 1968.

She has been married to Filipino businessman Delfin Lázaro for more than 40 years, and together they have two children, Lisa and Carlos,  and a grandchild.

Career
Lázaro began her career working as a reporter for ABS-CBN. Between July 1986 and December 1987, she became director and manager of the network's Public Affairs department. This allowed her to be appointed Team leader and Reporter for the network's coverage of President Corazon C. Aquino's visit to Singapore and Indonesia.

Lázaro soon left her position in ABS-CBN in 1988 to create her own production company, Probe Productions, with the help of fellow journalists, Luchi Cruz-Valdez and Maria Ressa. This led her to produce several documentary programs such as 5 and Up for ABC (later TV5, now The 5 Network or simply 5), The Probe Team, I-Witness, and Cheche Lazaro Presents for GMA Network, which eventually became her home network.

There, she was able to produce award-winning documentaries, particularly one involving the MV Doña Paz maritime disaster. The relationship with the network, however, was put to a test in 2003 when GMA-7 refused to air a Probe segment about a lifestyle check on PAGCOR Chairman Efraim Genuino. The network's reason was that the story as a half-baked job that would unjustly ruin the subject's reputation; Lázaro saw it as censorship. The rift was played out in media, and after 16 years of good relations with GMA-7, the network pre-terminated the contract of Probe.

Despite this setback, Lázaro returned to the limelight when Probe began reairing on ABC in June 2004. After a year's stay, she decided to go back in 2005 to her channel of origin, ABS-CBN. Between 1992 and 1995, Lázaro was also chairperson of the broadcast department at the University of the Philippines Diliman. Currently, she is a member and board advisor at the Philippine Center for Investigative Journalism.

Lázaro as a host has obtained various awards from Philippine award-giving bodies. She has been awarded 'Best News Magazine show host' nine times by the Star Awards. The Probe Team, the first Filipino investigative news magazine for television, has won both local and international recognition. It program received 'Gawad CCP Para sa Telebisyon "10 Best TV Programs of the Philippine Television" ten times.

Lázaro's last programme with the Probe Production team is Probe Profiles. Their last episode was aired July 1, 2010, and featured the story of President Benigno Aquino III on his candidacy and rise to power that year.

In 2018, Lazaro joined One News (owned by TV5 Network, replacing Bloomberg TV Philippines) as a host for Convo after she left Probe for 8 years and Che Che Lazaro Presents for 4 years.

Notable awards

References

CCP Continues Tradition of Recognition of Filipino Artists and Cultural Workers
https://web.archive.org/web/20110715114015/http://blog.probetv.com/2010/06/30/probe-signs-off-after-24-years-on-philippine-television/

External links
ProbeTeam Profile
ABS-CBN Entertainment Feature - The Probe Team

American women journalists
American writers of Filipino descent
Filipino television journalists
People from Quezon City
People from Los Angeles
University of the Philippines Diliman alumni
University of Michigan alumni
Living people
1945 births
GMA Integrated News and Public Affairs people
ABS-CBN News and Current Affairs people
TV5 Network
Journalists from California
21st-century American women